Fabio Escobar Benítez (born 2 February 1982 in Asunción) is a Paraguayan retired football forward.

Career
Escobar began his career in Sportivo San Lorenzo of Paraguay before playing for Puerto Montt of Chile, Club Toluca and Atlético Mexiquense of Mexico, Macara of Ecuador and Nacional Asunción of Paraguay. He was the top scorer in the 2008 Torneo Apertura.

In 2009, he joined Atlético Tucumán of Argentina, following their relegation from the Primera División he joined Argentinos Juniors in 2010.

Escobar competed as part of the Paraguay national football team in the 2004 Copa América.

References

External links
 
 
  
 

1982 births
Living people
Paraguayan footballers
Paraguay international footballers
Paraguayan expatriate footballers
Club Sportivo San Lorenzo footballers
Club Nacional footballers
Puerto Montt footballers
Deportivo Toluca F.C. players
Atlético Tucumán footballers
Argentinos Juniors footballers
Atlético Huila footballers
Deportivo Capiatá players
Club Rubio Ñu footballers
Sportivo Trinidense footballers
Deportivo Santaní players
Sportivo Luqueño players
Atlético Mexiquense footballers
Paraguayan Primera División players
Chilean Primera División players
Argentine Primera División players
Categoría Primera A players
Sportspeople from Asunción
Association football forwards
Paraguayan expatriate sportspeople in Argentina
Paraguayan expatriate sportspeople in Chile
Paraguayan expatriate sportspeople in Mexico
Paraguayan expatriate sportspeople in Ecuador
Paraguayan expatriate sportspeople in Colombia
Expatriate footballers in Argentina
Expatriate footballers in Chile
Expatriate footballers in Mexico
Expatriate footballers in Ecuador
Expatriate footballers in Colombia